The Szczecin Art Academy is a public university in Szczecin, Poland, founded on September 1, 2010. The profile of the university includes both music and visual arts with programmes offered in two different art disciplines. It consists of 4 faculties with BA and MA courses.

Faculties
 Faculty of Musical Education
 Instrumental Faculty
 Faculty of Visual Arts
 Faculty of Painting and New Media

References

External links 
 

Art schools in Poland
Music schools in Poland
Educational institutions established in 2010
2010 establishments in Poland
Universities and colleges in Szczecin